The 2011 SEC men's basketball tournament was held March 10–13, 2011 in Atlanta, Georgia at the Georgia Dome. The first, quarterfinal, and semifinal rounds were televised through the SEC Network and the semifinals and finals were broadcast nationwide on ABC, with the exception of the majority of South Carolina markets.

Seeds

All Southeastern Conference schools participate in the tournament.  Teams are seeded by 2010–11 SEC season record, with a tiebreaker system to seed teams with identical conference records.  The top two teams in each division receive a first round bye.

The seeding for the tournament is as follows:

Schedule

Bracket

* Game went into Overtime

References

2010–11 Southeastern Conference men's basketball season
SEC men's basketball tournament
2011 in sports in Georgia (U.S. state)
Basketball in Georgia (U.S. state)